FINE is an informal association of the four main fair trade networks: Fairtrade Labelling Organizations International (FLO), International Fair Trade Association (now the World Fair Trade Organization, WFTO), Network of European Worldshops (NEWS!) and European Fair Trade Association (EFTA) that was created in 1998.

Aims and goals 
The aim of FINE is to enable these networks and their members to cooperate on:
 the development of harmonized core standards and guidelines for fair trade,
 harmonization, and increase in the quality and efficiency of fair trade monitoring systems,
 advocacy and campaigning work, harmonization of their information and communication systems.

FINE is an informal working group. It has no formal structure and no decision-making power. Meetings are held as required. Preparation, hosting and facilitation of the meetings rotates between members. Decisions are taken by the boards of the FINE members.

Since April 2004 FINE has run a fair trade advocacy office in Brussels. Its role is to coordinate the advocacy activities of fair trade proponents at both the European and the international levels. The aim of the office is to step up public support for fair trade and to speak out for trade justice.

Definition of fair trade 
In 2001, FINE members agreed the following definition of fair trade, on which to base their
work:

FINE members further agreed to define fair trade's strategic intent as:
 deliberately to work with marginalised producers and workers in order to help them move from a position of vulnerability to security and economic self-sufficiency,
 to empower producers and workers as stakeholders in their own organisations,
 actively to play a wider role in the global arena to achieve greater equity in international trade.

FINE publications 
 FINE. (2005) Fair Trade in Europe 2005: Facts and Figures on Fair Trade in 25 European countries. Brussels: Fair Trade Advocacy  Office
 FINE (2006). Business Unusual. Brussels: Fair Trade Advocacy Office

External links 
 Fairtrade Labelling Organizations International (FLO)
 World Fair Trade Organization (WFTO)!
 European Fair Trade Association (EFTA)
 Fair Trade Advocacy Office

Fair trade organizations
Organizations established in 1998
Organisations based in Bonn